Luigi Busidoni (born October 21, 1911, in Pula) was an Italian professional football player.

1911 births
Year of death missing
Italian footballers
Serie A players
Spezia Calcio players
U.S. Triestina Calcio 1918 players
Juventus F.C. players
Venezia F.C. players
U.S. Fiumana players
HNK Rijeka players
Association football midfielders